This is a list containing the Billboard Hot Latin Tracks number-ones of 1997.

See also
Billboard Hot Latin Tracks

References

1997 record charts
Lists of Billboard Hot Latin Songs number-one songs
1997 in Latin music